Viktória Petróczi (born 27 February 1983, in Győr) is a former Hungarian team handball goalkeeper. She joined the coaching staff of Mosonmagyaróvári KC SE as a goalkeeping coach in 2019.

Achievements
Nemzeti Bajnokság I:
Winner: 2005, 2006
Magyar Kupa:
Winner: 2005, 2006
Liga Naţională:
Silver Medalist: 2010, 2011, 2012
Bronze Medalist: 2013
EHF Cup Winners' Cup:
Finalist: 2006
EHF Cup:
Finalist: 2002, 2004, 2005
Junior World Championship:
Silver Medalist: 2001, 2003

References

External links
 Career statistics at Worldhandball

1983 births
Living people
Sportspeople from Győr
Hungarian female handball players
Expatriate handball players
Hungarian expatriate sportspeople in Romania
Hungarian expatriate sportspeople in Slovakia
Győri Audi ETO KC players